Iliya Karapetrov (born 29 April 1992) is a Bulgarian footballer who plays as a midfielder.

References

External links

1992 births
Living people
Bulgarian footballers
Association football midfielders
PFC Pirin Gotse Delchev players
FC Lokomotiv Gorna Oryahovitsa players
OFC Pirin Blagoevgrad players
SFC Etar Veliko Tarnovo players
FC Botev Vratsa players
FC Oborishte players
FC Bansko players
FC Septemvri Simitli players
First Professional Football League (Bulgaria) players